Chuukese , also rendered Trukese , is a Chuukic language of the Austronesian language family spoken primarily on the islands of Chuuk in the Caroline Islands in Micronesia. There are communities of speakers on Pohnpei, and Guam. Estimates show that there are about 45,900 speakers in Micronesia.

Classification
Chuukese is an Austronesian language of the Micronesian subbranch. It is one of the dialects making up the Chuukic subgroup of Micronesian languages, together with its close relatives like Woleaian, Carolinian.

Phonology
Chuukese has the unusual feature of permitting word-initial geminate (double) consonants. The common ancestor of Western Micronesian languages is believed to have had this feature, but most of its modern descendants have lost it.

Consonants are doubled in Chuuk when they have a voiceless sound. Some consonant combinations are frequently denasalized between vowels when doubled.

 can be heard as either central  or back .

Orthography
Chuukese is one of the few languages allowing for word initial double consonants:

References

External links
 Chuukese Wordlist at the Austronesian Basic Vocabulary Database (Archive)
 Howard, Jocelyne. "CHUUKESE TRANSLATIONS." University of Hawaii.
 Kaipuleohone have archive materials for Chuukese including written materials, audio recordings, and additional audio recordings from Brian Diettrich's MA thesis.
 Portland State University Multicultural Topics in Communications Sciences & Disorders | Chuukese 

Languages of the Federated States of Micronesia
Chuukic languages